Hindu sacrifice may refer to:
                       
Yajna
Puja (Hinduism)
Animal sacrifice in Hinduism